Mariela Idivuoma (born 12 February 1976) is a Swedish-Sami freelance journalist and the host of the SVT's Sami news program Ođđasat. She has co-hosted the minority-language song festival Liet-Lávlut twice in 2006 together with Sofia Jannok and 2008 together with Rolf Digervall. Idivuoma lives together with Nordic combined skier Håvard Klemetsen, with whom she has a son. The couple resides in Trondheim, Norway.

References

1976 births
Living people
Swedish Sámi people
Swedish television journalists
Swedish women journalists
21st-century Swedish journalists
Women television journalists